French indie pop band Phoenix has released seven studio albums, two extended plays, one live album, twenty-three singles, and nineteen music videos. Their first three albums, United (2000), Alphabetical (2003), and It's Never Been Like That (2006), were released through Source, Virgin Records, and Astralwerks. The band received major commercial success following the release of Wolfgang Amadeus Phoenix (2009), which was released through V2 Records, Glassnote, Loyauté, and Cooperative Music. It was certified gold in Australia, Canada, and the United States. "1901", the album's lead single, was certified platinum in the US by the RIAA and "Lisztomania", the second single from the album, was certified gold. After signing with Atlantic Records, the band released Bankrupt! (2013), which peaked at number three in the band's home country of France, making it their highest-peaking album there. The band's sixth album, Ti Amo (2017), had a positive commercial performance. The band's seventh album Alpha Zulu was released on 4 November 2022.

Albums

Studio albums

Live albums

Extended plays

Singles

Promotional singles

Music videos
 "Funky Squaredance" (2000): directed by Roman Coppola
 "Too Young" (2001): directed by Steven Hanft
 "If I Ever Feel Better" (2001): directed by Alex and Martin
 "Everything Is Everything" (2004): directed by Roman Coppola
 "Run Run Run" (2004): directed by Mathieu Tonetti
 "I'm an Actor" (2004)
 "Long Distance Call" (2006): directed by Roman Coppola
 "Consolation Prizes" (2006): directed by Daniel Askill
 "Rally" (2007): directed by Daniel Askill and Lorin Askill
 "Lisztomania" (2009): directed by Antoine Wagner 
 "1901" (2009): directed by Dylan Byrne (Dazed Digital) and Ben Strebel (Bogstandard) 
 "Entertainment" (2013): directed by Patrick Daughters 
 "Trying to Be Cool/Drakkar Noir" (2013): directed by CANADA
 "Chloroform" (2013): directed by Sofia Coppola
"J-Boy" (2017): directed by Warren Fu
"Goodbye Soleil" (2017): footage by Dodi El Sherbini
"Ti Amo" (2017): directed by Wiissa
"Role Model" (2018) : directed by Chris Hopkins and Adrian Maben
"Identical" (2020) : directed by Roman Coppola
”Alpha Zulu” (2022) : directed by Pascal Teixeira, Emma Besson and Louis Bes
"Tonight" (2022) : directed by Oscar Boyson
"Winter Solstice" (2022) : directed by Warren Fu and Saoli Nash
"After Midnight" (2022) : directed by Pennacky

Notes

References

Discographies of French artists